is a horror short story by Hirofumi Tanaka.  It was originally planned as the first part of a much longer novel, however this project was abandoned when the publisher rejected Tanaka's proposal.  It was first collected in the Japanese Cthulhu Mythos collection Lair of the Hidden Gods, published by Tokyo Sōgensha.  It was translated into English by Daniel Day when the collection was published by Kurodahan Press in 2006.

Plot Overview
While sailing to Japan to spread Christianity, St. Francis Xavier is beset by recurring nightmares about a dark cave which gets closer with every dream.  Upon approaching the shore of the island, his ship runs into Cthulhu.  Xavier arrives in Japan...but he is changed.

Sources
 
 

Japanese horror novels